Seebäderschiff is a type of ship used for ferry service to the East Frisian Islands, Germany. The word is composed from the three words  See- (Sea) Bäder- (bathing resorts) Schiff (ship).

Gallery 

Ferries